Tando Allahyar railway station ({{lang-ur|{{Nastaliq|ٹنڈو اللہ یار ریلوے اسٹیشنSindhi: ٽنڊو الهيار ریلوي اسٽیشن) is located in Tando Allahyar, Sindh, Pakistan.

See also
 List of railway stations in Pakistan
 Pakistan Railways

References

External links
 

Railway stations in Tando Allahyar District
Railway stations on Hyderabad–Khokhrapar Branch Line